Pavel Kupka (born 21 April 1946) is a Czechoslovakian modern pentathlete. He competed at the 1968 Summer Olympics.

References

1946 births
Living people
Czechoslovak male modern pentathletes
Olympic modern pentathletes of Czechoslovakia
Modern pentathletes at the 1968 Summer Olympics
Sportspeople from Prague